Barf is the last studio album by Persian rock singer Farhad Mehrad. It was released in Iran in 2000.

Track listing

References

External links

Farhad Mehrad albums
2000 albums
Persian-language albums